The 1975 New Mexico State Aggies football team was an American football team that represented New Mexico State University in the Missouri Valley Conference during the 1975 NCAA Division I football season. In their third year under head coach Jim Bradley, the Aggies compiled a 5–6 record. The team played its home games at Memorial Stadium in Las Cruces, New Mexico.

Schedule

References

New Mexico State
New Mexico State Aggies football seasons
New Mexico State Aggies football